Gustave Lefebvre (17 July 1879 – 1 November 1957) was a French Egyptologist.  As inspector for Middle Egypt for the Egyptian Antiquities Service headed by Gaston Maspero, he managed the partage of Ludwig Borchardt's excavations at el-Amarna, Egypt, on 20 January 1913.  Borchardt and Lefebvre had come to an agreement where the artifacts found the year before by Borchardt's team would be split between the German Oriental Company (which financed the excavation) and the country of Egypt "à moitié exacte", or 50-50.  The bust of Nefertiti, discovered in the sands of the studio of the sculptor Thutmose, and was a piece that Borchardt wanted for Germany.  Recent evidence proves that Borchardt manipulated his way into keeping the bust.  Borchardt first showed the Egyptian official a photograph of the bust "that didn't show Nefertiti in her best light".  In the accompanying documents, the object was listed as a painted plaster bust of a princess.  When Gustave Lefebvre came for inspection, the bust was tightly wrapped up in the bottom of a box. The document reveals that Borchardt claimed the bust was made of gypsum (a very low-grade material) to mislead the inspector. Borchardt was one of the leading Egyptologists in the world, and knew that the bust was actually made out of limestone.   The bust was one of the artifacts at the top of the exchange list but was never asked for by the Egyptians in 1913.  The bust of Nefertiti was granted to Germany according to the provisions of Law No. 14 of 1912, and is today a primary exhibition of the Neues Museum in Berlin. Time magazine lists the bust of Nefertiti as one of the world's top 10 plundered artifacts.

See also
Lille Stesichorus

References

"Cairo Demands Clarification on Nefertiti Bust". Der Spiegel. 13 February 2009.
Raafat, Samir (1 March 2001). "Maa'had E l Swisrry" Cairo Times. via – Egy.com - Zamalek.
Boyes, Roger (11 February 2009). "Secret note reveals how Germany smuggled Queen Nefertiti bust from Egypt". The Times. via – Egy.com - Zamalek.

1879 births
1957 deaths
People from Bar-le-Duc
French Egyptologists
French hellenists
Academic staff of the École pratique des hautes études
Members of the Académie des Inscriptions et Belles-Lettres
Members of the French School at Athens
Corresponding Fellows of the British Academy